Kemalettin Şentürk (born 9 February 1970) is a Turkish retired footballer who played mainly as a sweeper but also as a defensive midfielder, and a manager.

He spent most of his career at Fenerbahçe, amassing Süper Lig totals of 222 matches and 33 goals over nine seasons. In 2010, he started working as a manager.

Club career
Born in Artvin, Şentürk started his professional career with Çaykur Rizespor in the second division, signing for Gençlerbirliği S.K. in 1991. He transferred to Fenerbahçe S.K. after two seasons, following brilliant displays in the Süper Lig and with the Turkish under-21 national team.

Always an important first-team element, Şentürk contributed with 24 matches and three goals in the 1995–96 campaign as Fenerbahçe lifted the national championship, scoring in a 3–1 home win against runners-up Trabzonspor on 9 December 1995. After a bout of indiscipline he was loaned to MKE Ankaragücü in January 1999, being instrumental in helping them avoid relegation.

Leaving Fenerbahçe in June 2000, Şentürk joined Diyarbakırspor, then made a brief top flight return with Antalyaspor and retired for good in late 2005, after having played for modest clubs: Kahramanmaraşspor, Osmaniyespor, Kütahyaspor, Mustafakemalpaşa Spor and MKE Kırıkkalespor.

International career
Şentürk played five times for Turkey during slightly more than one year, making his debut on 30 August 1995 in a 2–1 friendly home win over Macedonia.

Honours
Fenerbahçe
Süper Lig: 1995–96
TSYD Cup: 1993–94, 1994–95
Atatürk Cup: 1997–98
Chancellor Cup: 1997–98
Turkish Cup: Runner-up 1995–96

External links

1970 births
Living people
People from Artvin
Turkish footballers
Association football defenders
Association football midfielders
Süper Lig players
TFF First League players
Çaykur Rizespor footballers
Gençlerbirliği S.K. footballers
Fenerbahçe S.K. footballers
MKE Ankaragücü footballers
Diyarbakırspor footballers
Antalyaspor footballers
Kahramanmaraşspor footballers
MKE Kırıkkalespor footballers
Turkey under-21 international footballers
Turkey international footballers
Turkish football managers
Kayseri Erciyesspor managers
Mediterranean Games silver medalists for Turkey
Mediterranean Games medalists in football
Competitors at the 1991 Mediterranean Games